Casement may refer to:

 Casement (surname), a surname (including a list of people with the name)
 Casement Aerodrome, a military airfield near Dublin, Ireland
 Casement Park, the principal Gaelic Athletic Association stadium in Belfast, Northern Ireland
 Casement window, a window that is attached to the window frame with hinges at the side

See also
 Casemate, sometimes erroneously rendered "casement"